The Super Bowl officials are the officials chosen for the Super Bowl, the championship game of the National Football League (NFL), the largest and most prestigious professional American football league.

Selection
The NFL's highest-rated official at each position is selected to work the Super Bowl. This is determined by the league using an evaluation system to grade each official's calls during the year. However, only officials who have worked in the league for at least five seasons and have previously worked during the playoffs are eligible to officiate in a Super Bowl. A referee cannot work the Super Bowl at that position until she or he has been a referee for at least three seasons, while also meeting the five-year minimum service requirement.

This has not always been the case. From Super Bowl I to Super Bowl IV, when the game was the "AFL (American Football League)-NFL World Championship Game", the officiating crews consisted of members from both leagues. Then for Super Bowl XXXVIII and Super Bowl XXXIX, the NFL selected the highest rated crew during the regular season. This was a reaction to several officiating mistakes during the 2002-03 playoffs, and the league felt that preserving the familiarity and cohesiveness of the officiating crews during the postseason might reduce the errors.

List of officials
Note: A seven-official system was not used until Super Bowl XIII. Beginning with Super Bowl XXXIII, the league swapped position titles with the field judge and back judge.

AFL-NFL World Championships

NFL Championships

Note: prior to 2017, the Down Judge was known as the Head Linesman

Number of appearances
Throughout NFL history, five officials have been selected to work five Super Bowls and eight have been assigned to four Super Bowls. Jerry Markbreit is the only official to work four Super Bowls as the referee.

See also
American Football League Officials
List of NFL officials
Official (American football)
Super Bowl

Notes and references

Officials